Zdravko Dizdar (born 27 January 1948) is a Croatian historian.

Background
Dizdar attended elementary school in Orolik at Vinkovci from grades 1–4, before spending grades 5–8 in his native town of Oklaj. From there, he attended a grammar school in 1962 at Zemun. He began to study history in 1966 at the University of Belgrade Faculty of Philosophy, and graduated in 1970. He continued his education at the University of Zagreb.

Between 1972 and 1980, Dizdar worked as a curator at the Pounja Regional Museum in Bihać. He conducted collections, published contributions and organised exhibitions from the recent history of Pounja from 1878 to 1945, a micro-region in Croatia based around the Una River.

Under the Faculty of Philosophy in Zagreb 1979, he published The Workers' Movement in Pounja 1929–1941, and gained a doctorate with his dissertation Chetnik War Crimes in Bosnia and Herzegovina from 1941 to 1945.

Since 1980, he has been employed by the Croatian Institute for History in Zagreb.

Prizes and awards 
 Ljubica Štefan Award in 2011.

Works
 Radnički pokret u Pounju 1929-1941., Sarajevo, 1980.
 Građa za povijest narodnooslobodilačke borbe u sjeverozapadnoj Hrvatskoj 1941-1945., knjiga I (ožujak-prosinac 1941.), Zbornik dokumenata, Zagreb, 1981. 
 Građa za povijest NOB-e u sjevernozapadnoj Hrvatskoj 1941-1945., knjiga II /siječanj-lipanj 1942./, Zagreb, 1984.
 Građa za povijest NOB-e u sjevernozapadnoj Hrvatskoj 1941-1945., knjiga III  /srpanj-prosinac 1942./, Zagreb, 1984.
 Narodnooslobodilačka borba u Žumberku i na Gorjancima, Novo Mesto, 1986., tiskana uz hrvatski i na slovenskom jeziku. (suautor Zdenko Picelj, ml.) 
 Samobor 1941-1945., Samobor, 1987.
 Žumberačka NOU brigada, Beograd, 1989. (suautor Mane Borčić)
 Doprinos Hrvatske pobjedi antifašističke kaoalicije, Zagreb, 1996., 2. dopunjeno izdanje,(suautor Milivoj Kujundžić) 
 Životni miljokazi Mirka Validžića Ćelkanovića prominjskog književnika i kamenovanog župnika, Pazin, 1996.
 Prešućivani četnički zločini u Hrvatskoj i u Bosni i Hercegovini: 1941.-1945., Zagreb, 1999. (suautor Mihael Sobolevski)
 Hrvatska borba za opstojnost 1918.-1998., Zagreb, 2000. (suautor Milivoj Kujundžić)
 Četnički zločini u Bosni i Hercegovini: 1941.-1945., Zagreb, 2002.
 Zagrebačka županija, Zagreb, 2003. (suautor Suzana Leček)
 Partizanska i komunistička represija i zločini u Hrvatskoj 1944.-1946. godine. Dokumenti, Slavonski Brod, 2005. (suautori: Vladimir Geiger, Milan Pojić i Mato Rupić) 

Papers, scholarly contributions: Croatia Scientific Bibliography (CROSBI)

References

External links
 Zdravko Dizdar: Bjelovarski ustanak od 7. do 10. travnja 1941.
 HIC: Medjunarodni znanstveni skup "JUGOISTOCNA EUROPA 1918.-1995.", Četnički zločini genocida nad Hrvatima i Muslimanima u Bosni i Hercegovini i Hrvatima u Hrvatskoj tijekom Drugoga svjetskoga rata (1941.-1945.), Mr Zdravko Dizdar.

20th-century Croatian historians
1948 births
Living people
Historians of World War II
University of Belgrade Faculty of Philosophy alumni
People from Šibenik-Knin County
19th-century Croatian historians